RabidAnce (Hangul: 라비던스) is a South Korean crossover vocal group formed in 2020. The quartet finished runner-up in the JTBC TV singing audition show named Phantom Singer 3, which aired between April 10 and July 3, 2020. They comprise bass Kim Paul, tenor John Noh, sorikkun (Korean pansori singer) Ko Yeongyeol, and musical theater actor Hwang Gunha.

RabidAnce, which is a compound word made up of the English words "rabid" and "guidance", signifies the members' musical aspiration to "guide" audiences to their "rabid" musical diversity. During the show, RabidAnce performed genres of gugak, pop songs, world music, Korean popular music, etc. From the beginning of the formation, they have expressed their aims to become a vocal team which introduces Korean sentiments such as heung and han to the world since a Korean pansori singer is included in the group. They released two singles, "Thank You" (Korean: 고맙습니다 RR: Gomapseumnida) on November 9, 2020, and "The Song of Separation" (Korean: 이별가  RR: Ibyeolga) on November 27, 2020. RabidAnce released its first mini album PRISM on July 7, 2021. Additional digital single album Memory came shortly after that on November 19, 2021. In March 2022, the members of RabidAnce left CREDIA Music & Artists and established their own label called Neotrend Music. (Representative: Ko, Yeongyeol)

Members

Kim, Paul (Hangul:김바울) 

 Bass singer and the group leader

Bass Kim, Paul graduated from the College of Music of Kyung Hee University majoring in Vocal Music. The bass singer used to be a member of popera vocal group Ecclesia and gospel group Philos. In 2019, his team, Philos, was awarded in the Far East Broadcasting Company's gospel competitions.

Kim, Paul was born in Seoul on September 9, 1991. He was moved to Osaka, Japan, for his parents' missionary work and was a basketball player during his elementary school years in Osaka. He had been preparing for admission in a nursing program to achieve his dream of doing medical missionary work with his older brother.  However, when he was hospitalized for a knee injury during the military service and witnessed how nurses worked in a hospital, it led him to give up his dream. At his age of 22, he officially started musical training recommended by a conductor in his church to pursue his dream of becoming contemporary Christian music (CCM) musician, then was accepted into the College of Music of Kyung Hee University. After his graduation, Kim moved to Germany for post-grad studies, but returned to Korea to audition for Phantom Singer 3. Since September 2020, he has been with his management company, Arts & Artists.

John Noh (Korean name: 노종윤(Noh, Chongyoon)) 

 Tenor Singer

Tenor John Noh completed his Bachelor of Music program from the Peabody Institute of the Johns Hopkins University. After that, he received his master's degree from the Juilliard School and then finished the master of musical arts program at Yale School of Music with a full scholarship. John Noh made his debut at Carnegie Hall as a vocal soloist for the Mozart's "Requiem Mass in D minor" in 2018

John Noh, born on June 8, 1991, in Seoul, used to be a choirboy, capable of beatboxing, who frequently stopped by noraebang during his elementary and middle school days. When he was sent to attend a Christian high school in the U.S to take theology classes, it was to follow suit after his father who was a pastor. Right before his graduation, John viewed a clip of Pavarotti singing "Nessun dorma" from Puccini’s opera Turandot.  Deeply moved, he began studying vocal music. After the first year in Peabody, John couldn't afford the remaining years so he went back to Korea to do mandatory military service. Meanwhile, he was automatically dismissed from the university due to a leave of absence of more than one year. John made a video audition tape of himself singing a Mozart aria and sent it to Peabody that not only took him back but also gave him a scholarship. While pursuing his Master's degree at Yale University, his grandmother passed away in Korea. The incident made him realize he had never had a chance to show his performances to his family. John decided, if any chances were offered, he would come back to Korea to sing for his family, so he auditioned for Phantom Singer 3 to start his singing career in Korea.

Ko, Yeongyeol (Hangul:고영열) 
 Sorikkun (Pansori singer)

Korean pansori singer Ko, Yeongyeol graduated from the College of Music at Hanyang University majoring in Korean Traditional Music. He won (the 1st prize in) the pansori competition at the 34th annual Onnara Gugak Contest. He is a singer-songwriter based on a piano. Besides, a new word such as "Piano byeongchang (Hangul: 피아노 병창)" has been used when he performs a pansori accompanied by a piano by himself.

Ko, Yeongyeol was born on March 9, 1993, in Gwangju, South Korea. When he was 13, his mother advised him to start taking pansori lessons which was believed to be helpful to increase his lung capacity to become a professional swimmer. Instead, this experience helped him find his talent in pansori. The more his affection towards traditional music grew, the more his concerns deepened because of the public's low interest in the field. Also he has collaborated with artists from other genres such as Seunghee from Oh My Girl, bass singer Son Tae-jin from Forte di Quattro, and Indi duo Okdal. When asked what made him join Phantom Singer 3, he answered it was his desire to learn more about crossover music and form a crossover vocal group capable of a musical experiment.

Hwang, Gunha (Hangul: 황건하) 

 Musical theater actor

Hwang, Gunha is an undergraduate student at Chung-Ang University majoring in Theater. He received the High school Musical Star award at the DIMF (Daegu International Music Festival) and the gold prize in the middle & high school category at the Musical Star Festival in 2015.

Hwang, Gunha was born on August 7, 1997, in Anyang, Gyeonggi-do, South Korea. His older brother majored in classical piano and his mother loved going to performances with Gunha which, he said, influenced him a lot. When Hwang enrolled into Hanlim Arts High School with a musical major, it was his mother who encouraged him. PL Entertainment, usually representing big-name musical stars such as Hong Kwang Ho, recruited Hwang, Gunha even before he made an official debut as an actor. The CEO of PL Entertainment said when she met him she had a hunch that Hwang would one day become a big theater star, based on her long experience in this industry. He made his debut as a musical theater actor on August 19, 2021, playing a leading role, Yi Yeong, a crown prince of the Joseon Dynasty, in the Korean original musical called Forbidden Music (Korean: 금악, RR: Geumak)

Musical career

Pre-debut: Phantom Singer 3 
Phantom Singer is a crossover vocalist audition show aiming to find the male cross-over vocal quartet with potential. Each season consists of four rounds, and each participant progresses through the solo, duet, trio and quartet stages. Its third series, Phantom Singer 3 was aired between April 10, 2020, and July 3, 2020. Kim Paul, John Noh, Ko Yeongyeol and Hwang Gunha made it to the final round of Phantom singer 3.

1) The Preliminary Round

 Sarang-ga (Love Song, Hangul:사랑가 )

Ko, Yeongyeol rearranged "Saran-ga" from Pansori Chunhyangga for the piano and performed it in this round. One of the judges of the show, Ji-Yong(Known as Ji) commented, "There was a person who did crossover music by himself. I think this person is going to produce his own music later."

 The Prayer

John Noh sang "The Prayer," a duet song by Andrea Bocelli and Celine Dion. He played double roles in this song with a change in his vocalization from a tenor's silvery voice to a pop singing style.

 The Scent of Memory (Korean:기억의 향기, RR: Gieogui Hyanggi)

Kim Paul sang "The Scent of Memory" from Korean opera The Scent of Memory in this round.

 Jangbuga (Hangul:장부가)Hwang Gunha sang "Jangbuga(Hangul:장부가)" meaning the man song from Korean musical The Hero (Korean: 영웅, RR: yeongung) in the preliminary round for musical rookies.2) One on One Genre Match with Rivals Tú Eres la Música Que Tengo Que CantarAfter drawing lots to pick among genres Ko Yeongyeol got the genre of world music. Ko Yeongyeol appointed John Noh as a "rival" to compete with whom he would sing their duet song even when Ko Yeongyeol knew John Noh had to leave Korea briefly for the U.S. to deal with his academic schedule. They needed to use video calls when choosing songs for this round and eventually found Cuban singer Pablo Milanés' "Tú Eres la Música Que Tengo Que Cantar."3) Duet Match Ti PathosKo Yeongyeol asked Hwang Gunha to form a team with him and the duet sang "Ti Pathos" by Greek singer George Dalaras.4) Trio Match Becoming the Wind (Korean: 바람이 되어, RR: barami doeeo)Tenor John Noh and countertenor Choi Sunghoon (a member of La Poem) who sang together in the duet round picked bass Kim Paul as the final member for their trio round. They selected Ha Hyunsang's (a member of Hoppipolla) "Becoming the Wind (Korean: 바람이 되어, RR:  barami doeeo)," a piece from the OST album of Mr. Sunshine.

 To the Winds (Korean: 바람에게, RR: baramege)Ko Yeongyeol and Hwang Gunha who had put on a duet performance in the previous round drafted ByeongMin Gil as their trio member and sang Yoon Sang's "To the Winds (Korean: 바람에게, RR: baramege)."5) Quartet Match A Scary Time (Korean: 무서운 시간 RR: museoun sigan)All four members weren't ranked in top 3 (qualifying for keeping their trio members for the next round) and they had not been chosen as a 4th member by any of these three teams. After discussion by themselves, Kim Paul, John Noh, Ko Yeongyeol and Jeong Minseong (a member of La Poem) decided to form a quartet. What they chose for this round was a Korean creative gagok (or Korean lyric songs), "A Scary Time(Korean:무서운 시간 RR: museoun sigan)" composed by Kim Joowon with the lyrics from the poem of the same title written by Korean resistance poet Yun Dong-ju in 1941 at the end of the Japanese colonial era.

 The Formation of RabidAnce 
After Kim Paul, John Noh, Ko Yeongyeol and Hwang Gunha each went through every single round, they had formed the quartet team just before the final round. They, RabidAnce, performed 4 songs in the final round.

The Final Round of Phantom Singer 3

 Happy Traditional Song (Korean: 흥타령, RR: heungtaryeong)After the formation of RabidAnce, John Noh suggested they should sing a gugak song to open the final round, and they chose a Korean Namdo minyo (folk songs of the southern provinces in Korea), "Heung Taryeong (Hangul: 흥타령)" which described the transience of life in a sorrowful voice.

 Another StarTheir second song in this round was Stevie Wonder's "Another Star." In the middle of the song, tenor John Noh and pansori singer Ko Yeongyeol exchanged scat.

 After the Love has Gone (Korean: 사랑한 후에, RR: saranghan hue'')

Jeon In-kwon's "After the Love has Gone(Korean: 사랑한 후에, RR: saranghan hue'')" was their third song in the final round. Writing lyrics in Korean, Jeon In-kwon had remade Al Stewart's "The Palace of Versailles."

 Millim Yaffot Me'Eleh (Hebrew: מילים יפות מאלה)

RabidAnce put on their last performance with Israeli musical group Idan Raichel Project's "Milim Yaffot Me'Eleh (meaning "Nicer Words Than These")."

Discography

Studio albums

Singles and EPs

Videography

Music TV shows

Entertainment TV shows and Others

Reference section

External links section 
 Official YouTube Channel
 Official BIO on CREDIA (RabidAnce's agency) website

Crossover (music)
World music groups
Korean traditional music
Pop music
Bossa nova
Musical groups established in 2020
Korean musical groups
Vocal quartets
South Korean dance music groups
Year of birth missing (living people)
Living people